The Pădurani is a right tributary of the river Bunea in Romania. It flows into the Bunea near the village Pădurani.

References

Rivers of Romania
Rivers of Timiș County